Paraplatyptilia lutescens is a moth of the family Pterophoridae that is found in North America, including California.

References

Moths described in 1950
lutescens
Moths of North America